Rod Griffin (born June 18, 1956 in Fairmont, North Carolina) is a retired American professional basketball player. The 6'7" power forward spent four seasons playing at Wake Forest University, playing for the Wake Forest Demon Deacons. He was the 1977 ACC Player of the year.  He was selected in the first round (17th pick overall) of the 1978 NBA Draft by the Denver Nuggets. He played 13 years in Italy and in 1997 he became italian citizen; in Forlì the supporters called him "Sindaco", italian word for Mayor.

References

Sources
 Article on draft
 Article on Griffin waiver

1956 births
Living people
All-American college men's basketball players
American expatriate basketball people in Italy
American men's basketball players
Basketball players from North Carolina
Denver Nuggets draft picks
Naturalised citizens of Italy
People from Fairmont, North Carolina
Power forwards (basketball)
Wake Forest Demon Deacons men's basketball players